Aurora Campagna is an Italian freestyle wrestler. She won the silver medal in the 62 kg event at the 2019 European Wrestling Championships held in Bucharest, Romania. In the final, she lost against Taybe Yusein of Bulgaria.

Career 

In 2018, she competed in the 62 kg event at the European Wrestling Championships held in Kaspiysk, Russia. She lost her first match against Taybe Yusein of Bulgaria and in the repechage she also lost her next match against Agnieszka Król of Poland. At the 2018 World Junior Wrestling Championships held in Trnava, Slovakia, she won one of the bronze medals in the 62 kg event.

At the 2019 World Wrestling Championships held in Nur-Sultan, Kazakhstan, she was eliminated in her first match by Marianna Sastin of Hungary.

In 2020, she competed in the 62 kg event at the European Wrestling Championships held in Rome, Italy where she was eliminated in her first match by Tetiana Omelchenko of Azerbaijan. In the same year, she competed in the 62 kg event at the 2020 Individual Wrestling World Cup held in Belgrade, Serbia.

In 2021, she lost her bronze medal match in the 62 kg event at the U23 World Wrestling Championships held in Belgrade, Serbia.

Major results

References

External links 
 

Living people
Year of birth missing (living people)
Place of birth missing (living people)
Italian female sport wrestlers
European Wrestling Championships medalists
21st-century Italian women